The New Jersey State Museum is located at 195-205 West State Street in Trenton, New Jersey. It serves a broad region between New York City and Philadelphia. The museum's collections include natural history specimens, archaeological and ethnographic artifacts, and cultural history and fine art objects. Exhibitions, educational activities, research programs, and lectures are also offered. The museum, a division of the New Jersey Department of State, includes a 140-seat planetarium and a 384-seat auditorium.

History
The New Jersey State Museum was the first state museum in the country established with education as a primary focus of its mission. The New Jersey Legislature formally established the museum by law in 1895, and the museum was housed in the New Jersey State House; the museum received initial accreditation from the American Alliance of Museums in 1974 and has maintained accredited status continuously since that time. The museum is a division of the New Jersey Department of State.

In its beginning, like many museums of its era, the museum focused on natural history. The first major collections were of rocks, minerals, and fossils from the New Jersey Geological Survey, which began in 1836. In 1912, the museum expanded its focus to include archaeology through the acquisition of artifacts produced by Native Americans in the region. These artifacts dated from the prehistoric and historic periods as well as from New Jersey's diverse populations during the Colonial and post-colonial eras. In 1922, the museum was one of the first on the east coast to exhibit, as art, a collection of North American Indian objects. With the acquisition of these objects, the museum started its ethnographic collections. In 1924, decorative arts were added to the museum with examples from the Trenton-area ceramics industry. In 1929, the museum moved into a larger space in the newly constructed State House Annex. While fine art had been exhibited and acquired through the mid-20th century, the museum began a strong collecting emphasis on paintings, sculpture and works on paper in the early 1960s.

In 1964, the museum moved from the State House Annex into facilities created specifically for it within the newly created Capitol Cultural Complex. The museum's main building consists of four floors of exhibition, program, laboratory, and research space, a 140-seat Planetarium, and a Museum Gift Shop. An adjacent building contains a 384-seat Auditorium, as well as gallery spaces.

Since 1968, the museum's work has been supported in part by the New Jersey State Museum Foundation (formerly Association for the Arts of the New Jersey State Museum and the Friends of the New Jersey State Museum). Founded as a non-government, non-profit 501(c)(3) organization, the foundation is led by a Board of Trustees and small paid staff, all of who work to support the museum's collections, exhibitions, and programs through fundraising, volunteerism, and advocacy. The foundation also operates the museum membership program and the Museum Shop, which sells merchandise related to the museum's exhibitions, collections, and New Jersey history and culture. Shop proceeds support the New Jersey State Museum's collections, exhibitions, and programs.

Bureau of Archaeology/Ethnography

The Bureau of Archaeology/Ethnography collections encompass approximately 2.4 million prehistoric and historic specimens acquired by nearly 100 years of excavation, as well as almost 4,000 ethnographic objects acquired as gifts to the museum. Scholars widely recognize the museum's archaeology specimens as the definitive systematic research collection for the study of the prehistory of New Jersey. Notably, the archaeological collection includes material excavated from the nearby Abbott Farm National Historic Landmark Site.

The ethnographic collection consists of specimens that represent the Lenape and other North American Indian groups.

Bureau of Cultural History

The Bureau of Cultural History collection includes over 13,000 artifacts documenting New Jersey's cultural, economic, military, political, and social history, as well as aspects of its decorative arts. The Cultural History Bureau also oversees the preservation and interpretation of the New Jersey State Capitol's collection of military flags used by New Jersey regiments in the Civil War and World War I.

Bureau of Fine Art

The State Museum has collected over 12,000 works of art including paintings, prints, drawings, sculpture, and photographs, most acquired since 1965 when the museum's mission was expanded to include fine art.

The collection has an American focus that highlights the work of New Jersey artists within the context of American art history. Also included are works that depict New Jersey scenes and events. The strengths of the Fine Art collection lie in works by the American modernists associated with Alfred Stieglitz, American abstract artists of the 1930s and 1940s, a comprehensive collection of works by 19th through 21st-century African-American artists, contemporary American and New Jersey art, the complete graphic outputs of Ben Shahn and Jacob Landau and print and paper work by the New Jersey Fellows associated with the Brodsky Center.  The Fine Art History Bureau also has curatorial responsibility for the State House Portrait Collection which includes portraits of New Jersey's governors, jurists, and other state officials.

Bureau of Natural History

The Bureau of Natural History holds a diverse collection of about 250,000 specimens that have historic and cultural significance, in addition to their scientific value. The natural history collections are especially strong in industrial minerals and ores, paleontology specimens (fossils), osteology specimens (bones), modern shells, and a systematic study skin component. Smaller sub-collections include pinned insects, fluid-preserved fauna, taxidermy mounts and glass lantern slides. The bureau is also the repository for about 300 types (first documented) specimens of Paleozoic and Mesozoic fossils, as well as a large number of fossils documenting the Paleozoic strata within the Delaware Water Gap National Recreation Area. Minerals from the zinc-mining locality of Franklin-Sterling Hill are well represented, including the largest number of fluorescent mineral species in the world, as are mine-specific specimens from New Jersey's industrial iron mining past. Specimens from beyond New Jersey are used for comparative purposes in exhibitions and educational programming, to augment the systematic collections, and for research purposes.

Bureau of Education and Public Programs

The museum's Bureau of Education offers programs and events. School groups can attend museum-based classes, hands-on workshops, exhibition tours, and planetarium programs, as well as access classroom resources such as curriculum guides.

Since its opening in 1964, the State Museum's planetarium has been a large part of the museum's public programming. The 140-seat planetarium is equipped with "Full Dome" video technology and also includes a digital video hemisphere as part of the planetarium lobby exhibitions. Exhibits include displays of constellations, solar system models and space exploration. The planetarium presents public shows on weekends, during school vacation periods (spring and winter), and during the summer.

References

External links
New Jersey State Museum

Archaeological museums in New Jersey
Art museums and galleries in New Jersey
History museums in New Jersey
Institutions accredited by the American Alliance of Museums
Museums established in 1895
Museums in Trenton, New Jersey
Native American museums in New Jersey
Natural history museums in New Jersey
Planetaria in the United States